Disodium enneaborate is the traditional name for a salt of sodium, boron, oxygen, and hydrogen, with elemental formula  or . It is the sodium borate with the highest boron/sodium ratio.

Structure

The correct formula has since been determined to be .  The anion is a linear polymer with repeating unit . Sodium cations, water molecules, and undissociated boric acid molecules  lie between the chains, held by numerous hydrogen bonds.

The compound crystallizes in the monoclinic crystal system with space group P21/n.  The cell parameters are a = 1021.3 pm, b = 1294.0 pm, c = 1245.7 pm, β = 93.070°, V = 1.6440 nm3, and Z = 2. The sodium cations occur in groups of four with interatomic distances of 378.30 pm and 379.32 pm.

Reactions
Upon heating, disodium enneaborate initially becomes amorphous and then crystallizes as anhydrous disodium octaborate α- along with amorphous . Notably, the former contains octaborate fundamental building blocks that are topologically equivalent to those in the enneaborate.

References

Borates
Sodium compounds